The Cave is a 2019 Syrian-Danish documentary film directed by Feras Fayyad and written by Fayyad and Alisar Hasan. A companion piece to his earlier film Last Men in Aleppo, the film profiles Dr. Amani Ballour, a physician in Ghouta who is operating a makeshift hospital nicknamed "the Cave" during the Syrian Civil War. The film premiered at the Toronto International Film Festival (TIFF) on September 5, 2019.

Summary
In an interview, Fayyad said his purpose in making the film was to create documentary evidence that could be used to seek justice for innocent victims of the civil war. "The film should put people in an uncomfortable position to look through the terrible reality around us," he said.

Reception
The site's consensus states that "A hard-hitting documentary with imagery as powerful as its message, The Cave poses heartbreakingly urgent questions -- and leaves them for the viewer to answer." It also has a score of 83 out of 100 on Metacritic, based on 21 critics, indicating "universal acclaim". The film received the Cinema For Peace Foundation award for the Most Valuable Documentary of the Year at the 2020 Berlin Film Festival.

Accolades
The film premiered at the 2019 Toronto International Film Festival, where it won the People's Choice Award for Documentaries.

The Cave won The Cinema for Peace Award for The Most Valuable Documentary of the Year for 2019. 

The Cave was nominated for Best Documentary Feature at the 92nd Academy Awards.

References

External links

Official trailer

2019 films
2019 multilingual films
Danish documentary films
2010s Arabic-language films
Documentary films about the Syrian civil war
Documentary films about women in war
Documentary films about health care
National Geographic Society films
Syrian documentary films
Peabody Award-winning broadcasts
Primetime Emmy Award-winning broadcasts
2010s American films